The Wonka Xploder was a chocolate bar launched by Nestlé in the United States in 2000, and in the UK in 1999. In Australia, it was released under the "KaBoom" name.

Described as "tongue crackling candy", the bar's ingredients included milk chocolate and popping candy.

The bar was discontinued in 2005, but was re-released as "Tinglerz" in 2008.

Notes 

Products introduced in 1999
Chocolate bars
Nestlé brands
Products and services discontinued in 2005
The Willy Wonka Candy Company brands